Shirreff Base (official name Cape Shirreff Field Station) is a seasonal field station in the Southern Ocean operated by the United States and opened in 1996. It is situated on the east side of Cape Shirreff on Ioannes Paulus II Peninsula on Livingston Island in the South Shetland Islands off the Antarctic peninsula.

It is adjacent to the Chilean base called Doctor Guillermo Mann.

Location
The base is located 1.58 km southeast of Cape Shirreff and 3.32 km west-northwest of Black Point (detailed Chilean mapping in 2004. Bulgarian mapping in 2005 and 2009).

Maps
 L.L. Ivanov et al., Antarctica: Livingston Island and Greenwich Island, South Shetland Islands (from English Strait to Morton Strait, with illustrations and ice-cover distribution), 1:100000 scale topographic map, Antarctic Place-names Commission of Bulgaria, Sofia, 2005.
 L.L. Ivanov. Antarctica: Livingston Island and Greenwich, Robert, Snow and Smith Islands. Scale 1:120000 topographic map. Troyan: Manfred Wörner Foundation, 2010.  (First edition 2009. )
 Antarctic Digital Database (ADD). Scale 1:250000 topographic map of Antarctica. Scientific Committee on Antarctic Research (SCAR), 1993–2016.

See also
 List of research stations in Antarctica
 Antarctic field camps

Notes

References
 Management Plan for Antarctic Specially Protected Area No. 149 Cape Shirreff and San Telmo Island. Measure 2 (2005), Annex H, ATCM XXVIII Final Report. Stockholm, 2005
 Photo of Shirreff Base with Black Point and Mount Friesland in the background. NOAA Fisheries Service's Southwest Fisheries Science Center.
 Ivanov, L. General Geography and History of Livingston Island. In: Bulgarian Antarctic Research: A Synthesis. Eds. C. Pimpirev and N. Chipev. Sofia: St. Kliment Ohridski University Press, 2015. pp. 17–28. 

Geography of Livingston Island
Outposts of the South Shetland Islands
1996 establishments in Antarctica